In mathematics, specifically functional analysis, the Schatten norm (or Schatten–von-Neumann norm)
arises as a generalization of p-integrability similar to the trace class norm and the Hilbert–Schmidt norm.

Definition
Let ,  be Hilbert spaces, and  a (linear) bounded operator from 

 

 

for  

Properties

 

 They satisfy Hölder's inequality: for all  and  such that , and operators  defined between Hilbert spaces  and  respectively,
 
If  satisfy , then we have
 . 
The latter version of Hölder's inequality is proven in higher generality (for noncommutative  spaces instead of Schatten-p classes) in 
(For matrices the latter result is found in )

 Sub-multiplicativity: For all  and operators  defined between Hilbert spaces  and  respectively,

 

 Monotonicity: For ,

 

 Duality: Let  be finite-dimensional Hilbert spaces,  and  such that , then

 

where  denotes the Hilbert–Schmidt inner product.

Let  be two orthonormal basis of the Hilbert spaces , then for 

 .

Remarks

For  the function  is an example of a quasinorm.

With this norm,  is a Banach space, and a Hilbert space for p = 2.

Observe that , the algebra of compact operators. This follows from the fact that if the sum is finite the spectrum will be finite or countable with the origin as limit point, and hence a compact operator (see compact operator on Hilbert space).

The case p = 1 is often referred to as the nuclear norm (also known as the trace norm, or the Ky Fan 'n'-norm)

See also
Matrix Norms

References

 Rajendra Bhatia, Matrix analysis, Vol. 169. Springer Science & Business Media, 1997.
 John Watrous, Theory of Quantum Information, 2.3 Norms of operators, lecture notes, University of Waterloo, 2011.
 Joachim Weidmann, Linear operators in Hilbert spaces, Vol. 20. Springer, New York, 1980.

Operator theory